Skai Moore (born January 8, 1995) is an American football linebacker who is currently a free agent. He played college football at South Carolina and signed with the Colts as an undrafted free agent in 2018.

Professional career
Moore signed with the Indianapolis Colts as an undrafted free agent on May 1, 2018. After making the Colts 53-man roster, he played in three games, starting one, before being waived on September 28, 2018. He was re-signed to the practice squad on October 1, 2018. He was promoted back to the active roster on October 4, 2018. He was waived again on October 13, 2018 and was re-signed to the practice squad. He was promoted back to the active roster on November 9, 2018. He was placed on injured reserve on December 18, 2018.

On August 31, 2019, Moore was waived by the Colts and was signed to the practice squad the next day. He was promoted to the active roster on December 28, 2019.

Moore chose to opt-out of the 2020 season due to the COVID-19 pandemic on August 4, 2020. He was waived/injured on August 23, 2021 and placed on injured reserve.

References

External links
Indianapolis Colts bio
South Carolina Gamecocks bio

1995 births
Living people
American football linebackers
Indianapolis Colts players
NSU University School alumni
People from Cooper City, Florida
Players of American football from Florida
South Carolina Gamecocks football players
Sportspeople from Broward County, Florida